Parafield railway station is located on the Gawler line.

History 

Parafield opened in 1928 to serve the then under construction Parafield Airport adjacent to the line.

In 1982 the station was rebuilt at the same time as standardisation of the mainline from Adelaide to Port Pirie. Commencing in April 2008, the eastern platform was rebuilt again with the western platform rebuilt in 2014. To the west of the station lies the Australian Rail Track Corporation standard gauge line to Crystal Brook.

Services by platform

References

Railway stations in Adelaide
Railway stations in Australia opened in 1928